Siarhei Kukharenka (born 8 May 1976) is a Belarusian judoka.

Achievements

References

External links
 
 

1976 births
Living people
Belarusian male judoka
Judoka at the 2000 Summer Olympics
Judoka at the 2004 Summer Olympics
Olympic judoka of Belarus
20th-century Belarusian people
21st-century Belarusian people